Mon curé chez les nudistes is a French sex comedy from 1982 directed by Robert Thomas. The main role is played by Paul Préboist.

Plot
French comedy about a local priest with a good mood who is sent to teach morals at a nudist colony with hilarious consequences.

Cast
 Paul Préboist ...  Priest Daniel
 Georges Descrières ...  Monseigneur
 Henri Génès ...  Truffard
 Philippe Nicaud ...  Léon
 Katia Tchenko ...  Gladys
 Jean-Marc Thibault ...  Antoine
 Ramiro Olivera ...  Alex - Antoine's son
 Brigitte Auber ...  Charlotte - Antoine's wife
 Marc de Jonge ...  Oscar, the hairdresser

External links
 IMDb entry
Film poster
Film poster 2

1982 films
French sex comedy films
1980s sex comedy films
1980s French-language films
1980s French films